Hodges Point is a rocky point terminating in an impressive black cliff, lying  east-northeast of Cape Northrop on the east coast of Graham Land, Antarctica. The feature was photographed by the United States Antarctic Service, 1939–41. It was mapped by the Falkland Islands Dependencies Survey 1947–48, and named by the UK Antarctic Place-Names Committee for Ben Hodges, General Assistant with the British Antarctic Survey Larsen Ice Shelf party, 1963–64.

References

Headlands of Graham Land
Foyn Coast